Yasmin Williams is an American composer and solo performing finger-style guitarist. She plays several instruments like the kalimba, harp-guitar, and guitar with the strings facing up while on her lap.

Early life and education
Williams grew up in Northern Virginia. In December 2017, she graduated from New York University with a degree in music theory and composition.

Music 
Williams was inspired to start learning guitar from the game Guitar Hero 2. She plays the guitar in an inventive way, tuning the strings to be in harmony then playing it a bit more like a piano with lots of finger picking while the guitar sits in her lap. She also adds in other elements, often to introduce rhythm to her wordless compositions. Pitchfork described her musical approach, "Williams’ inventive style, which has also involved wearing tap shoes and taking a cello bow to her instrument, has made her stand out in the field of solo guitarists." Rolling Stone describe her songs as "textured, harmonious soundscapes".

William's second album, Urban Driftwood, was written during 2020 during the COVID-19 lockdown and was influenced by the Black Lives Matter protests during the summer.

Albums
Serendipity (self-released, 2012)
Unwind (self-released, 2018)
Urban Driftwood (Spinster, 2021)

References

External links
Official website
William's Tiny Desk Concert

21st-century American women guitarists
21st-century American guitarists
American guitarists
Living people
Year of birth missing (living people)